Jerome Sacca Kina Guezere (1952 – 11 January 2005) was a Beninese politician. He was the Fourth Vice-President of the African Union's Pan-African Parliament.

He was elected to the National Assembly of Benin for the first time in the 1991 parliamentary election and was again elected in 1995. He was a founding member of the Action Front for Renewal and Development (FARD-Alafia) in 1994. From 1996 to 1998, he served as Minister of Rural Development under President Mathieu Kérékou. In the March 1999 parliamentary election he was again elected to the National Assembly as a FARD-Alafia candidate, and he became President of the Solidarity and Progress Parliamentary Group following the election. In the March 2003 parliamentary election, he was elected as a Union for Future Benin (UBF) candidate (with FARD-Alafia being one of the component parties of the UBF). He also served as First Vice-President of the National Assembly.

He was elected Fourth Vice-President of the Pan-African Parliament when it was inaugurated in March 2004. He was representing the Pan-African Parliament at Ghanaian President John Kufuor's inauguration for his second term in Accra when he fell ill, and he subsequently died in Benin on 11 January 2005.

References

1952 births
2005 deaths
Members of the National Assembly (Benin)
Union for Future Benin politicians
Action Front for Renewal and Development politicians
Members of the Pan-African Parliament from Benin